The Misericórdia is a church located in Sé, Braga, Portugal.

Built in 1562 it is considered the most important legacy of the Renaissance period in the city, despite the profound changes it suffered in the 18th and 19th centuries.

Roman Catholic churches in Braga